The China Girls Mathematical Olympiad (CGMO) is a math competition with a proof-based format similar to the International Mathematical Olympiad. It was originally organized in 2002 for teams of girls representing different regions within China.  Later, the Chinese organizers decided to invite other nations to send teams of girls from their countries.  Russia has participated at least since 2004.  The United States participated in 2007-2012.

Further reading 
"At the China Girls Math Olympiad" in FOCUS, November 2007 pages 10–11

External links 
 Mathematical Sciences Research Institute: US Team travelogue for 2010 China Girls Math Olympiad
 Mathematical Sciences Research Institute: US Team travelogue for 2009 China Girls Math Olympiad
 Mathematical Sciences Research Institute: US Team travelogue for 2008 China Girls Math Olympiad
 Mathematical Association of America:  China Girls Math Olympiad: Success for US Teams
 Mathematical Sciences Research Institute: US Team travelogue for 2007 China Girls Math Olympiad
 The St. Petersburg Times:  City Girl Gets Gold in World Math Olympiad
 Voice of America:  First US Team to Compete in the China Girls Math Olympiad

Mathematics competitions
Recurring events established in 2002
2002 establishments in China